Fame and Glory (20 March 2006 – 13 February 2017) was an Irish Thoroughbred horse whose wins include the Critérium de Saint-Cloud, Irish Derby, Tattersalls Gold Cup, Coronation Cup and Ascot Gold Cup.

Background
Fame and Glory was a bay horse bred by the Coolmore Stud. He was sired by the Prix de l'Arc de Triomphe winner Montjeu. During his racing career he was registered as being owned by Derrick Smith, Sue Magnier, Michael Tabor and Mrs F Hay. He was trained at Ballydoyle by Aidan O'Brien.

Racing career

2008: two-year-old season
Fame and Glory began his racing career by winning  a maiden race at Navan Racecourse on 22 October 2008. He was then sent to France and moved up markedly in class to contest the Group One Critérium de Saint-Cloud. Racing over 2000 metres on heavy ground he was ridden by Johnny Murtagh and won by half a length from his stable companion Drumbeat.

2009: three-year-old season
At three, he went to Epsom via the same route as the previous stablemate Derby winner Galileo and High Chaparral, winning the Ballysax Stakes and Derrinstown Stud Derby Trial in Ireland. He ran second behind Sea the Stars in The Derby.

In June 2009, the horse won the Irish Derby, the 8-11 favourite, ridden by Johnny Murtagh, took up the running from stablemate Golden Sword (11-1) with 300m to go and won by five lengths. He then ran second behind Sea the Stars in the Irish Champion Stakes before finishing unplaced in the Prix de l'Arc de Triomphe and Champion Stakes.

2010: four-year-old season
Fame And Glory's 2010 campaign saw two further Group One victories in the Tattersalls Gold Cup and the Coronation Cup, with his season finishing with an unplaced run in the Arc.

2011: five-year-old season
Set on a staying campaign in 2011, his first two runs resulted in victories in the Vintage Crop Stakes and Saval Beg Stakes. Following these performances he was sent off 11/8 favourite for the Ascot Gold Cup, and duly won by three lengths.

2012: six-year-old season
Fame and Glory began his six-year-old season with a win in the Listed Vintage Crop Stakes at Navan, but his subsequent efforts were disappointing. He finished unplaced in the Ascot Gold Cup, Irish St Leger and British Champions' Long Distance Cup and was pulled up in the Breeders' Cup Marathon.

Stud career and death
At the end of his racing career Fame and Glory was retired to become a breeding stallion at the Grange Stud. He died in February 2017 after suffering a suspected heart attack while covering a mare.

Pedigree

References

2006 racehorse births
2017 racehorse deaths
Racehorses trained in Ireland
Racehorses bred in Ireland
Irish Classic Race winners
Thoroughbred family 1-i